The 2013–14 season was Burnley's 4th consecutive season in the Championship. They also competed in the League Cup and the FA Cup.

Match details
League positions are sourced from Statto, while the remaining contents of each table are sourced from the references in the "Ref" column.

League table

Football League Championship

FA Cup

Football League Cup

Squad statistics

Numbers in parentheses denote appearances as substitute.
Players with names struck through and marked  left the club during the playing season.
Players with names in italics and marked * were on loan from another club for the whole of their season with Burnley.
Players listed with no appearances have been in the matchday squad but only as unused substitutes.
Key to positions: GK – Goalkeeper; DF – Defender; MF – Midfielder; FW – Forward

Transfers

In

Out

Loans in

Loans out

See also
List of Burnley F.C. seasons

References

2013-14
2013–14 Football League Championship by team